Strain crystallization is a phenomenon in which an initially amorphous solid material undergoes a phase transformation due to the application of strain. Strain crystallization occurs in natural rubber, as well as other elastomers and polymers. The phenomenon has important effects on strength and fatigue properties.

How strain crystallization occurs 
Strain crystallization occurs when the chains of molecules in a material become ordered during deformation activities in some polymers and elastomers. The three primary factors that affect strain crystallization are the molecular structure of the polymer or elastomer, the temperature, and the deformation being applied to the material. If a polymer's molecular structure is too irregular, strain crystallization can not be induced because it is impossible to order the chains of molecules. In order to induce strain crystallization, the polymer or elastomer is stretched while its temperature is kept above its glass transition temperature. It is also necessary for the yield point of the polymer to be exceeded by the stretching activity. This in turn will ensure that the chains of molecules are straightened. In general, the greater the deformation applied to the material, the higher the rate of crystallization.

Effects of strain crystallization 
The mechanical properties of materials are greatly affected by the orientation of the crystals in their micro-structure. The process of strain crystallization directly affects the micro-structure of the material by adding crystalline structures. Strain crystallization's effect on the micro-structure greatly increases the strength of the polymer or elastomer it is induced in. This effect of strain crystallization can be viewed in vulcanized natural rubber, a material that is known for its toughness and tensile stress.

Measuring strain crystallization 
There are various techniques for measuring crystallization in rubber, including: x-ray diffraction, specific heat changes, and density changes. Crystallization can also be observed indirectly through its effects on stress–strain and fatigue behavior.

See also
Crystallization of polymers

Some polymers that strain crystallize
Polyethylene
Polyethylene Terephthalate

Some elastomers that strain crystallize
Natural rubber (polyisoprene)
Polychloroprene

Some elastomers that do not strain crystallize
Polybutadiene
Styrene-butadiene

References

Sources
Chapter 1, Engineering with Rubber, Ed. A. N. Gent, Hanser, 1992. .
B. Huneau, STRAIN-INDUCED CRYSTALLIZATION OF NATURAL RUBBER: A REVIEW OF X-RAY DIFFRACTION INVESTIGATIONS, Rubber Chem. Technol. 84, 425 (2011);  
Mars, W. V. (2009). Computed dependence of rubber's fatigue behavior on strain crystallization. Rubber Chemistry and Technology, 82(1), 51–61.
Chapter 10 – Strength of Elastomers, A.N. Gent, W.V. Mars, In: James E. Mark, Burak Erman and Mike Roland, Editor(s), The Science and Technology of Rubber (Fourth Edition), Academic Press, Boston, 2013, Pages 473–516, 10.1016/B978-0-12-394584-6.00010-8
Rao, I,J; Rajagopal, K.R. (2001–02). "A study of strain-induced crystallization of polymers". International Journal of Solids and Structures. 38 (6-7): 1149-1167 https://doi.org/10.1016/S0020-7683(00)00079-2. ISSN 0020-7683.
Battjes, Kevin P.; Kuo, Chung-Mien; Miller, Robert L.; Saam, John C. (1995-05). "Strain-induced Crystallization in Poly[methyl](3,3,3-trifluoropropyl)siloxane] Network". Marcromolecules 28 (3): 790-792. Strain-Induced Crystallization in Poly[methyl(3,3,3-trifluoropropyl)siloxane Networks]. ISSN 0024-9297
Toki, S.; Fujimaki, T.; Okuyama, M. (2000–06). "Strain-induced crystallization of natural rubber as detected real-time by wide-angle X-ray diffraction technique". Polymer. 41 (14): 5423-5429. Strain-induced crystallization of natural rubber as detected real-time by wide-angle X-ray diffraction technique. ISSN 0032-3861.
"Crystallization". polymerdatabase.com. Retrieved 2018-12-08.

Rubber properties